Carabus elysii elysii is a subspecies of ground beetle in the Carabinae subfamily that is endemic to China. They could be found in the cities like Anhui, Hubei, Hunan, and Sichuan. The subspecies are black coloured with either brown or pink pronotum.

References

elysii elysii
Beetles described in 1856
Endemic fauna of China